János Dunai (born 26 July 1937) was a former Hungarian footballer. He won a bronze medal with the Hungarian national team at the 1960 Summer Olympics in Rome, Italy.

References

External links
 János Dunai at national-football-teams.com
 János Dunai at footballdatabase.eu

1937 births
Hungarian footballers
Hungary international footballers
Footballers at the 1960 Summer Olympics
Olympic footballers of Hungary
Olympic bronze medalists for Hungary
Olympic medalists in football
Medalists at the 1960 Summer Olympics
Pécsi MFC players
Association football forwards
Hungarian football managers
Living people
Pécsi MFC managers